Heir-Loons is a 1925 American silent comedy film directed by Grover Jones and starring Wallace MacDonald, Edith Roberts and Stuart Holmes.

Cast
 Wallace MacDonald as 	Geoge Brockton
 Edith Roberts as Mary Dale
 Cecille Evans as Marjie Trenton
 Frank Campeau as Brockton family member
 Stuart Holmes as Brockton family member
 Snitz Edwards as Brockton family member
 Martha Mattox as Brockton family member
 Emily Gerdes as 	Brockton family member
 Theodore Lorch	
 Sam De Grasse  	
 Max Asher		
 Ralph Lewis  		
 William H. Turner	
 Harry McCoy

References

Bibliography
 Munden, Kenneth White. The American Film Institute Catalog of Motion Pictures Produced in the United States, Part 1. University of California Press, 1997.

External links
 

1925 films
1925 comedy films
1920s English-language films
American silent feature films
Silent American comedy films
Pathé Exchange films
American black-and-white films
Films directed by Grover Jones
1920s American films